Unggul Futsal Club Malang (formerly known as Banteng Muda) is an Indonesian professional futsal club based in Malang, East Java. The club currently play in Indonesia Pro Futsal League after became the winner of Nusantara Futsal League season 2021–22.

Honours
 Nusantara Futsal League
 Champions: 2021–22
 Nusantara Futsal League (East Java zone)
 Champions: 2021–22

References

Futsal clubs in Indonesia
Futsal clubs established in 2018
2018 establishments in Indonesia